Strelnikov (Стрельников) is a surname of Russian origin. It may refer to:

Aleksandr Strelnikov (born 1947), Russian politician
Dmitry Strelnikov (born 1969), Russian writer, biologist and journalist
Ivan Strelnikov (1939–1969), Russian border guard hero of the USSR
Nikolay Strelnikov (1888–1939), Russian composer
Vasily Strelnikov (born 1962), Russian-American VJ
Vladimir Strelnikov (born 1939), Ukrainian artist
Pasha Antipov "Strelnikov", a fictional Russian revolutionary of the novel and film Doctor Zhivago
Russian-language surnames